Isaac Samuel Leevy Johnson (born May 16, 1942) is an American politician in the state of South Carolina. He served in the South Carolina House of Representatives from 1970 to 1980, representing Richland County, South Carolina. An alumnus of the University of Minnesota, Benedict College, and the University of South Carolina School of Law (becoming its first African American graduate), he is a lawyer and owner of Leevy's Funeral Home.</ref> In 1985, he became the first black president of the South Carolina Bar Association.

He graduated from the University of Minnesota in 1962 with an associate of mortuary science degree. He then matriculated at Benedict College, receiving a bachelor's degree in business in 1965 before graduating from the University of South Carolina School of Law in 1968. In 1970, he became one of the first black men elected to the South Carolina general assembly. After leaving the legislature he became a member of the board of trustees at then South Carolina State College.  At this very first meeting, he was elected chairman of the board and would serve until. In 1990, he was awarded the Order of the Palmetto. and has received every major award (including being inducted into the American College of Trial Lawyers) accredited to an attorney in the United States of America.  He still practices law with his son George Craig Johnson and operates the family funeral home with his other son, Chris Leevy Johnson.

References

1942 births
Living people
People from Columbia, South Carolina
University of Minnesota alumni
University of South Carolina School of Law alumni
Members of the South Carolina House of Representatives